Kyle Miller (born May 12, 1989 in Overland Park, Kansas) is an American soccer player.

Career

College and amateur
Miller played four years of college soccer at Rockhurst University between 2008 and 2011. While at college, Miller also appeared for USL PDL club Kansas City Brass during their 2011 season.

Professional
Miller was drafted in the third round (54th overall) of the 2012 MLS Supplemental Draft by Sporting Kansas City. Miller spent two years with Sporting, but never made a first-team appearance. He was waived by the club on December 11, 2013.

Miller signed with USL Pro club Oklahoma City Energy on February 5, 2014.

After a season with Oklahoma City, Miller signed with NASL club Atlanta Silverbacks on February 3, 2015.

References

External links

1989 births
Living people
American soccer players
Kansas City Brass players
Sporting Kansas City players
OKC Energy FC players
Atlanta Silverbacks players
Association football defenders
Sporting Kansas City draft picks
USL League Two players
USL Championship players
North American Soccer League players
Soccer players from Kansas
Sportspeople from Overland Park, Kansas